Rustington is a small town and civil parish in the Arun District of West Sussex. Rustington is approximately at the midpoint of the West Sussex coast and midway between the county town of Chichester and Brighton. The A259 runs along the north of Rustington, westward to Littlehampton, Bognor Regis and Chichester, and east to Worthing and Brighton. The area forms part of the Brighton and Hove built-up area.

With a population of over 14,000 in 2014, it has the size and facilities of a small town, including a shopping area with a mix of independent and chain stores. The parish of Rustington includes the neighbourhood of West Preston.

History
Rustington was in World War I home to a planned American aerodrome, to the east of the High Street. Intended to launch bombing raids against Germany, the airfield was incomplete when the war ended.

Conservation area and information centre
Rustington contains a conservation area which extends from the south end of North Lane to The Lamb in The Street. Here, where trees are protected, are the largest number of pre-1850 listed buildings in the post town, with The Street and surrounding roads containing some of the finest 17th and 18th century Sussex flint cottages in West Sussex, some of which are thatched.

There is a village information centre at the Broadmark Lane car park, housed in the recently renovated WRVS building in the Waitrose car park.  It also houses Rustington Museum, exploring the village's history from the Stone Age to the modern day with artefacts from throughout time.

Annual events
Rustington competes annually in the South-East in Bloom competition. It holds an annual carnival and fête in August.  Close to Christmas Eve, Rustington has a village carol concert which is free for local residents and features local school children accompanied by the Littlehampton Concert Band.

Geography
It has three main recreation grounds and neither woodland nor fields.

In music, literature and the media
"Rustington" is a well-known hymn tune by Hubert Parry, who lived and died in Rustington.

Rustington achieved national fame in 1956 with the launch of Flanders and Swann's show At the Drop of a Hat, in which "The Gnu Song" contains the lines:

Shopping facilities
Rustington has independent shops such as butchers, greengrocers and bakers.  It has some major banks and a post office serving a population of 40,000.  Pedestrianised areas benefit the Churchill Court Shopping Courtyard. On display in the high street is a large Late Ice Age erratic boulder; this was brought to Rustington on ice during the last Ice Age. It was re-discovered in a local field named Stonefield having been used as a boundary marker for many years. Rustington also has a retail park on the A259 road.

Sport and leisure
Rustington has an amateur football club Rustington F.C. who play at the Recreation Ground. Also a cricket club based on the same ground and play throughout the summer with two teams on Saturdays and one on Sundays. In 2006, they didn't lose a single match, earning them a mention on Sky Sports News on New Year's Eve. In 2017 the club celebrated its 125 Anniversary. The Saturday teams play in the West Sussex Invitation League and in 2016 the first eleven won the Division 4 title.
There is also a thriving table tennis club , Woodlands TTC who are based at The Woodlands Centre who meet on Tuesdays and Thursdays.

Transport
Rustington shares Angmering railway station with Angmering and East Preston. Trains from this station go to Brighton and Portsmouth/Southampton, as well as regular services to London.

Bus services to Brighton and Portsmouth are provided by the Coastliner 700 with many stops within the village itself.

In the news

Hot cross bun
Paul Pegrum, of Pegrum's bakery (now Forfar's), created the world's biggest hot cross bun to publicise Rustington at Easter 2002. After four hours of cooking, the bun surpassed two out of the three existing records.

Air speed records
Two world air speed records were set over Rustington sea front.

Set on 7 September 1946, by Group Captain Teddy Donaldson, flying a Gloster Meteor Star. Donaldson also became the first man to exceed .

To celebrate, on 7 September 1996, Neville Duke returned to Rustington to unveil a plaque, marking the event, joined by a Gloster Meteor and a Hawker Hunter, which flew over the sea front.

Twin towns
Los Altos, United States
Künzell, Germany

Notable people

Lindsay Anderson, Indian-born English feature film, theatre and documentary director, film critic, and leading light of the Free Cinema movement and the British New Wave. He wrote If.... while living in his mother's house on the village's Sea Estate.
J M Barrie, Scottish author and dramatist; a friend of the Llewellyn Davies family who had a house in Rustington and were the inspiration of his book Peter Pan.
Delirious?, English Christian rock and worship band members lived in the village.
Huw Edwards-Jones, cabinetmaker and five-time Guild Mark recipient, was born in Rustington.
Agnes Garrett (who, with her cousin Rhoda Garrett opened the first interior design company in Britain to be run by women) had a house in Rustington. Agnes's sister Millicent Garrett Fawcett (suffragist leader) also lived there after she was widowed. Another sister, Elizabeth Garrett Anderson (first woman to qualify as a doctor), also visited.
Nigel Hitchcock, saxophonist
Stanley Holloway, English actor, comedian, singer and monologist who lived next to the sea at East Preston.
Sir Geoffrey Jellicoe, landscape architect, garden designer, architect and author, raised in Rustington.
Sir Hubert Parry, composer of hymn melodies, some becoming templates, including '"Rustington".  He lived in Sea Lane (from 1880-d.1918).
Andrew Pearson, cricketer who played for Bedfordshire.
Ed Petrie, British comedian, actor and television presenter. He was born and raised in the village.
George Posford, English composer, most notably famed for "Good Night Vienna"
Graham Sutherland, English artist
Mitchell Symons, journalist and bestselling author. He has lived just outside the village since 1995.
Ben Thatcher, drummer of the popular British rock duo Royal Blood.
Brian White, cartoonist. He spent much of his later life in the village.
Leslie Arthur Wilcox R.I., R.S.M.A., marine artist. He lived in Cove Road from 1963 to 1982.

References

External links

Rustington Village Website - History

Arun District
Populated coastal places in West Sussex
Towns in West Sussex
Beaches of West Sussex